Van Freeman White (August 2, 1924 – July 14, 1993) was a politician from Minneapolis, Minnesota. He was the first African-American to be elected to the Minneapolis City Council, serving from 1980–1989.

Life and career

White was born in North Minneapolis in 1924. His father died when he was 10 years old leaving him, the eldest of his five siblings, responsible to help take care of the family. He attended Patrick Henry High School, graduating in 1943 and later working in construction. He became involved with several North Minneapolis community organizations and also began working with the Minnesota Department of Economic Security.

White won a city council seat in 1979. He encouraged commercial development in his North Minneapolis ward and also supported new housing developments, parks and school buildings. White died in 1993 at his home in North Minneapolis. He is survived by his wife Javanese White, 2 children son Perri White and daughter Javoni White children and 1 granddaughter Kapria White

Van White Memorial Boulevard, a street in Minneapolis's Near North community, is named in his honor.

References

Minneapolis City Council members
1924 births
1993 deaths
20th-century American politicians